Nils Orvar Trolle (4 April 1900 – 7 March 1971) was a Swedish freestyle swimmer. He competed in the 100m and 4×200 m events at the 1920 and 1924 Olympics; he won a bronze medal in the relay in 1924 and finished fourth in 1920. He failed to reach the finals of the individual 100m freestyle. In 1923–24, he competed for Illinois AC while studying in the United States, and in 1940–44, he headed his native club Malmö SS.

References

1900 births
1971 deaths
Sportspeople from Malmö
Olympic swimmers of Sweden
Swimmers at the 1920 Summer Olympics
Swimmers at the 1924 Summer Olympics
Olympic bronze medalists for Sweden
Olympic bronze medalists in swimming
Swedish male freestyle swimmers
Medalists at the 1924 Summer Olympics
Malmö SS swimmers
SoIK Hellas swimmers
20th-century Swedish people